My Christmas is a 2014 album by Plácido Domingo for Sony Classical, featuring also Helene Fischer, The Piano Guys, Plácido Domingo Jr., Czech National Symphony Choir, Czech National Symphony Orchestra, conducted by Eugene Kohn.

Track listing 
	"Have Yourself A Merry Little Christmas" with Vincent Niclo
	"Guardian Angels" with Idina Menzel - written by Harpo Marx
	"Silent Night" with The Piano Guys
	"What Child Is This" with  Helene Fischer
	"God Rest Ye Merry, Gentlemen" with  The Voices Of Los Angeles Opera's Domingo-Colburn-Stein Young Artist Program
	"Hark! The Herald Angels Sing"	
	"Andrew Lloyd Webber: setting of the Pie Jesu from Requiem with  Jackie Evancho
	"Astro del ciel", version of Silent Night by Franz X. Gruber
	"Loving Christmas with You" with  Hayley Westenra, written by Plácido Domingo Jr.
	"It Came Upon The Midnight Clear"	
	"White Christmas" with  Plácido Domingo Jr.
	Mozart: Ave verum corpus KV 618  
	"Feliz Navidad" with  Banda El Recodo

References

Plácido Domingo albums
Sony Records albums
2014 Christmas albums
Christmas albums by Spanish artists
Classical crossover albums
Classical Christmas albums